The Siret or Sireth is a river that rises from the Carpathians in the Northern Bukovina region of Ukraine, and flows southward into Romania before it joins the Danube. In ancient times, it was named Hierasus (Ancient Greek Ιερασός).

Towns and villages

The following towns and villages are situated along the river Siret, from source to mouth: Berehomet, Storozhynets, Siret, Grămești, Zvoriștea, Liteni, Dolhasca, Pașcani, Stolniceni-Prăjescu, Roman, Bacău, Adjud, Mărășești, Galați.

Tributaries

The following rivers are tributaries to the river Siret (from source to mouth):

Left: Bahna (Mihăileni), Molnița, Bahna (Lozna), Gârla Sirețel, Gârla Huțanilor, Vorona, Pleșul, Turbata, Pietrosul, Sirețel, Stolniceni, Hărmănești, Pârâul Țigăncilor, Mihăili, Boca, Albuia, Rediu, Vulpășești, Pârâul Pietros, Țiganca, Icușești, Glodeni, Râpaș, Moara, Bogdănești, Valea Morii, Ulm, Racova, Tamași, Răcătău, Soci, Fulgeriș, Rogoza, Polocin, Lupa, Bârlad, Călmățui, Geru, Bârlădel, Rusca, Mălina, Cătușa.

Right: Malyi Seret, Găvan, Negostina, Pârâul Mare, Verehia, Baranca, Leahu, Stâncuța, Hănțești, Grigorești, Sălăgeni, Suceava, Șomuzul Mic, Șomuzul Mare, Pârâul lui Pulpa, Trestioara, Conțeasca, Ruja, Sodomeni, Valea Părului, Podul Turcului (Draga), Moldova, Valea Neagră, Turbata, Precista, Bistrița, Bahna, Valea Mare, Cleja (or Tocila), Răcăciuni, Drăgușeni, Scurta, Bolohan, Fântânele, Conțești, Trotuș, Valea Boului, Carecna, Câmpul, Zăbrăuț, Șușița, Gârla Morilor, Putna Seacă, Putna, Leica, Râmnicul Sărat, Buzău.

2010 floodings
During July 2010, Gheorghe Flutur, president of Suceava County, told the Mediafax news agency his region was one of the worst hit in the country on the morning of the 29th, as he co-ordinated local flood relief work in his stricken county. Later that day, the Siret river threatened to break through the dykes protecting the town of Șendreni, as locals and emergency services reinforced the dykes with truckloads of sandbags to prevent the river breaking out and flooding the town.

See also
Global storm activity of 2010
2010 Romanian floods

References

External links

Rivers of Romania
 
Rivers of Botoșani County
Rivers of Suceava County
Rivers of Neamț County
Rivers of Iași County
Rivers of Bacău County
Rivers of Vrancea County
Rivers of Galați County
Rivers of Chernivtsi Oblast
International rivers of Europe